Karenkonia is a monotypic moth genus in the family Lasiocampidae first described by Shōnen Matsumura in 1932. Its single species, Karenkonia taiwana, described by the same author in the same year, is found in Taiwan.

References

Lasiocampidae
Monotypic moth genera
Taxa named by Shōnen Matsumura